The Camaquã State Park  is a state park in the state of Rio Grande do Sul, Brazil.

Location

The Camaquã State Park is in the municipalities of Camaquã and São Lourenço do Sul, Rio Grande do Sul.
The park is in the transition between the pampas and Atlantic Forest biomes, mostly in the latter.
It was created to protect the wetlands of the Camaquã River lagoon delta, including the Banhado do Caipira, Rincão do Escuro and many islands.
It covers the banks of the Lagoa dos Patos from the Banhado do Caipira to the pontal, and covers the Camaquã river valley up to the settlement of Pacheca.

History

The Camaquã State Park was created by decree 23.798 of 12 March 1975.
As of 2016 the park did not have a management plan and was not open for visitors.
The land had not been surveyed, and ownership had not been regularized.

Notes

Sources

State parks of Brazil
Protected areas established in 1975
1975 establishments in Brazil
Protected areas of Rio Grande do Sul